Jean Robillard is a Canadian doctor and academic administrator, currently serving as the Vice President for Medical Affairs at the University of Iowa. He is also the dean of the Roy J. and Lucille A. Carver College of Medicine. Following the retirement of Sally Mason, he served as the interim president from August to November 2015 before Bruce Harreld took over.

A pediatric nephrologist, he earned bachelor’s and medical degrees from the Université de Montréal.

References

Living people
University of Iowa staff
Université de Montréal alumni
Presidents of the University of Iowa
Year of birth missing (living people)